Vriesde is a surname. Notable people with the surname include:

Anton Vriesde (born 1968), Dutch footballer
Letitia Vriesde (born 1964), Surinamese middle distance runner